Kurtis Gaskell (born April 28, 1990) is a Canadian pair skater. With former partner Brittany Jones, he is the 2009 Canadian Junior champion. Jones and Gaskell ended their partnership in 2012.

Programs 
(with Jones)

Competitive highlights 
(with Jones)

References

External links 

 

1990 births
Canadian male pair skaters
Living people
Sportspeople from Guelph
20th-century Canadian people
21st-century Canadian people